The Jurema River is a river in Ceará, Brazil.

See also
List of rivers of Ceará

References
Brazilian Ministry of Transport

Rivers of Ceará